Capol is an old Swiss noble family from the canton of Grisons. 
The family's origin is the Swiss village of Flims.  Capol (or former named Capal) people of this family name have lived in this region since the 11th century.
Variations of the family name include "Capoll", "Cappol", "Cappoll", "Cappal", "Kapol"  and "Kapool".

Johann Gaudenz von Capol (1641–1723), a member of the leading family of Flims, built the Schlössli (Little Castle), a manor house, in 1682.
The Reiche Stübe, or "Rich Room", of this manor is visitable in the Metropolitan museum.
On the floor of the castle the coat of arms of the Capol, a golden arrow on a black shield, is clearly visible.

Many Capols have fought for countries other that Switzerland. 
One family line emigrated to Ulm in Germany in 1637, another to France in 1757.
Capols were involved in the Battle of Calven (Grisons) 1499, in the battle of Marciano near Siena (Italy) 1554, in the Battle of Ramillies (Belgium) 1706 and Battle of Barrenkopf or Vosges Mountain (France) in First World War 1914.  
Members of the Capol family owned also many castles in Grisons: Castle "Schlössli" Flims, Castle Untertagstein in Thusis, Castle Ringgenberg, Castle Rietberg and Castle Löwenberg.

The family spread over the world. So members of the family live in Germany, France, United States and Philippines.

References

Literature
 Konrad Huber, Raetic book of names, Part 1, Berna 1986
 Robert von Planta and Andrea Schorta, Raetic book of names, Part 2, Berna 1986
 Collection "Capoliana" in Federal Archive of Canton Grisons

Swiss noble families